Dragana Mirković (born 18 January 1968) is a Serbian pop-folk singer and entrepreneur. She rose to prominence in the eighties as a member of the popular collective Južni Vetar. Today, Mirković is recognised as one of the best-selling artists from the former Yugoslavia. Alongside her husband, she also founded a satellite music channel called DM SAT.

Life and career

Early life
Mirković was born on 18 January 1968, in Kasidol, a village near Požarevac, SR Serbia, SFR Yugoslavia. The youngest of two children, she grew up in the same household as her parents, grandparents and sister Dušica. Mirković has described her upbringing as "Yugoslav", noting the peaceful co-existence between Slavs of different faiths at the time. A musical influence in her youth was her grandfather, Dragutin, who played the accordion. At the age of five, she learned to sing the Bosnian folk song "Djevojka sokolu zulum učinila". Mirković recalled that she cried because of the events portrayed in the song. As a child, she began singing as a soloist in elementary school performances and competitions. Later, she would sing at various celebrations in Kasidol, which caught the attention of record executives.

1984–1991: Early success and Južni vetar
When she was 14, executives at the Diskos record label approached Mirković's parents with the idea of having her record a song in their studio. The result was Imam dečka nemirnog, which was released as a full studio album in 1984. Her second studio album Umiljato oko moje was released in 1985 and sold 250,000 copies. In the mid-1980s, Mirković began her collaboration with the music band Južni Vetar, composed of Miodrag Ilić as the bass guitarist, Sava Bojić lead guitarist and Perica Zdravković for keyboard. Spasi me samoće, which was released in 1986, was her first studio album with the group and sold over 400,000 copies. In addition to Mirković, the musical formation utilized other singers from Bosnia and Serbia and received widespread support from Yugoslavs, as folk music became the best-selling genre of the 1980s. She went on to record four more albums with Južni Vetar: Ruže cvetaju samo u pesmama (1987), Najlepši par (1988), Simpatija (1989) and Pomisli želju (1990).

1990s: Solo success
In 1991, Mirković released her eighth studio album (and third solo project), Dobra devojka, which featured two major hit singles: "Umreću zbog tebe" and "Kazi mi sunce moje". The album was followed by Dolaze nam bolji dani in 1992, which featured multiple hit songs, "Umirem majko", "Pitaju me u mom kraju", "Da, da, da", and "O, da li znaš". Mirković's tenth studio album, Do poslednjeg daha, was released in 1993, which featured numerous hit singles, such as "Do poslednjeg daha", “Bas tebe volim ja”,  "Bicu njegova", “and "Vetrovi tuge". In 1994, she released her eleventh studio album, Nije tebi do mene, which included multiple hit singles such as, "Nisam ni metar od tebe", "Varala bih, varala" and "Opojni su zumbuli". The same year, Mirković starred in the feature film, Slatko od snova, playing the role of a girl who works in a fast food restaurant and dreams of becoming a famous singer.

Mirković released four more albums in the 1990s: Plači, zemljo (1995), which featured the hit singles, "I u dobru i u zlu", "Vrati mi se ti", "Uzeo si moja jutra" and "Divlja devojka", Nema promene (1996), with hit singles, "Dušu si mi opio", "To nije tvoja stvar" and "Oči pune tuge", and Kojom gorom (1997), with songs like "Poslednje veče", "Dolina kestenova", and the title track. Her final release of the 1990s was, U godini (1999), a collaborative album with Zlaja Band. After the release of her seventeenth studio album, Sama, which featured the hit singles, "Svatovi", and the title track, she went on a four-year hiatus.

2004–2017: Return
In 2004, Mirković returned with her seventeenth studio album, Trag u vremenu. The comeback album featured multiple hit singles, including "Tamo gde je milo moje", "Evo dobro sam", "Zašto zoro svanjavaš" and "Preživeću". In 2006, she released her eighteenth studio album, Luče moje , featuring the hit singles "Pečat na usnama", "Na kraju", "Sudbina" and "Luce moje". In 2008, she released Eksplozija, which featured the singles, "Laste", "Zemljo okreni se", "Sve bih dala da si tu", and "Život moj".

In 2011, she released three new songs and a remake of an old song of hers. "Drugovi", "Srce moje" and "Jedini", were all released to critical acclaim. The remake of her 1991 song, "Umreću zbog tebe" was well received. The four songs, along with sixteen new ones, were featured on her twentieth studio album, 20, which was released in 2012. In 2014, Mirković released a duet with José Feliciano titled "Please Don't Go Away". The same year, she held a concert at Štark Arena in front of 20,000 fans to celebrate the 30th anniversary of her music career. In 2017, she released her twenty-first studio album, Od milion jedan.

Tours
In 2023, Mirković and her husband, Toni Bijelić, were greeted by actor Jean-Claude Van Damme upon their arrival in Hollywood, CA and were accompanied by Ukrainian actress Marina Mazepa, ahead of her USA tour, which commenced in Phoenix, AZ.

Other ventures

In 2005, Mirković and her husband Toni Bijelić founded DM SAT, a satellite music video channel.

Mirković held a humanitarian concert in Zenica, Bosnia on 7 November 2012 in the Arena Zenica. The concert, called "Dragana and Friends for Zenica", also featured singers Hanka Paldum, Boban Rajović, Halid Muslimović, and the band Plavi orkestar. The concert raised around €26,500 (about $36,500 US dollars) for the People's Kitchen. The following month, Serbian tabloids claimed that "local politicians" in Zenica had taken €7,500 of the money to pay for renting out the arena, and another €11,500 for the sound system, leaving only about €7,500 of the money to charity. The tabloids claimed that the majority of the money went for the politicians' personal use. During the concert, Mirković and Hanka Paldum first publicly sang their duet "Kad nas vide zagrljene" (When They See Us Embrace). The song officially premiered one year later on 26 November 2013, when the music video was released. and was featured prominently in Serbian and Bosnian media.

On 19 December 2013, Mirković, along with Lepa Brena, Severina, Haris Džinović, Aca Lukas and Jelena Karleuša, was a guest at a humanitarian concert by Goran Bregović at the Olympic Hall Juan Antonio Samaranch in the Bosnian capital city Sarajevo for the Roma in Bosnia and Herzegovina.

Personal life
In 1999, Mirković married Austrian businessman Toni Bijelić. They have two children together, Marko and Manuela.

Artistry

Musical style
Mirković is known for her "oriental" style of turbo folk. Her performance is often sentimental— resulting with songs in which the theme of female suffering in romantic relationships is prominent.

Legacy
Mirković is seen as one of the most popular Serbian folk singers, particularly in the turbo folk genre, as well as being one of the most successful recording artists from the former Yugoslavia.

Discography
Studio albums

Imam dečka nemirnog (1984)
Umiljato oko moje (1985)
Spasi me samoće (1986)
Ruže cvetaju samo u pesmama (1987)
Najlepši par (1988)
Simpatija (1989)
Pomisli želju (1990)
Dobra devojka (1991)
Dolaze nam bolji dani (1992)
Do poslednjeg daha (1993)
Nije tebi do mene (1994)
Plači zemljo (1995)
Nema promene (1996)
Kojom gorom (1997)
U godini (1999)
Sama (2000)
Trag u vremenu (2004)
Luče moje (2006)
Eksplozija (2008)
20 (2012)
Od milion jedan (2017)

Other
Slatko Od Snova (1994)
Zauvek (2003)

References

Sources

External links

DMSAT Official fan page
DM Official site

1968 births
Living people
Musicians from Požarevac
Serbian turbo-folk singers
Serbian folk-pop singers
21st-century Serbian women singers
Serbian folk singers
Grand Production artists
20th-century Serbian women singers